The 1294 papal conclave (23–24 December) was convoked in Naples after the resignation of Pope Celestine V on 13 December 1294. Celestine V had only months earlier restored the election procedures set forth in the papal bull Ubi periculum of Pope Gregory X, which had been suspended by Pope Adrian V in July 1276. Every papal election since then has been a papal conclave. It was the first papal conclave held during the lifetime of the preceding pontiff, an event not repeated until the 2013 papal conclave following the resignation of Pope Benedict XVI.

Abdication of Celestine V

Celestine V, founder of the Order of Celestines, widely esteemed and venerated for his holiness, was elected to the papacy on 7 July 1294, as a compromise choice after an over two-years long sede vacante. It quickly became clear that this saintly eremite was wholly incompetent and unsuited for a job as pope. Admitting his own incompetence soon after his election, Celestine expressed the wish to abdicate and return to his solitary cave in the Abruzzi Mountains. However, before doing so he issued two bulls. The first bull established the regulations concerning the abdication of a pope.  The second bull (Quia in futurum, 28 September 1294) restored the constitution Ubi periculum, which established the papal conclave; the constitution had been suspended by Pope Adrian V in July 1276. During his short papacy, he also created 13 cardinals. Eventually, on 13 December 1294, Celestine V abdicated the papacy at Naples, three days after confirming the restoration of the institution of the papal conclave.

It has been widely stated that the alleged great influence of the ambitious Cardinal Benedetto Caetani and the pressure he applied on Celestine V were important factors in Celestine's decision to abdicate, but it seems nearly as certain that it was an entirely voluntarily step of the Pope, with the role of Caetani limited to participation in the solution of the legal problems connected with the resignation of a pope. In particular, there were doubts whether a pope could resign at all, and who would be authorized to accept such a resignation.

List of participants

All 22 living cardinals participated in the conclave; 12 of them were created by Celestine V, five by Nicholas IV, two by Nicholas III, one by Urban IV and one by Honorius IV:

Election of Pope Boniface VIII

On 23 December 1294, the cardinals assembled in the Castel Nuovo at Naples for the election of the successor of Celestine V.  On the next day, Christmas Eve, Cardinal Benedetto Caetani  received the required two-thirds majority and took the name of Boniface VIII.  Caetani's nephew, who was an eyewitness, says that Caetani was elected after one scrutiny and an accessio: scrutinio accessioneque eligitur. Soon after his election he returned to Rome, where on 23 January 1295 he received his episcopal consecration from Cardinal Hugh Aycelin, Bishop of Ostia. He was  crowned by Matteo Rosso Orsini, who was prior Diaconorum of the Sacred College.

Notes

References

Sources

 Konrad Eubel, Hierarchia Catholica Medii Aevi, volumen I, 1913
 F. Burkle-Young: notes to the papal election of 1294 (The Cardinals of the Holy Roman Church by S. Miranda)
 The Catholic Encyclopedia: Celestine V
 The Catholic Encyclopedia:Boniface VIII

1294
13th-century elections
1294
13th-century Catholicism
1294 in Europe